A canine vector-borne disease (CVBD) is one of "a group of globally distributed and rapidly spreading illnesses that are caused by a range of pathogens transmitted by arthropods including ticks, fleas, mosquitoes and phlebotomine sandflies." CVBDs are important in the fields of veterinary medicine, animal welfare, and public health. Some CVBDs are of zoonotic concern.

Many CVBD are transmissible to humans as well as companion animals. Some CVBD are fatal; most can only be controlled, not cured. Therefore, infection should be avoided by preventing arthropod vectors from feeding on the blood of their preferred hosts. While it is well known that arthropods transmit bacteria and protozoa during blood feeds, viruses are also becoming recognized as another group of transmitted pathogens of both animals and humans.

Some canine vector-borne pathogens of major zoonotic concern are found worldwide, while others are localized by continent. Listed by vector, some such pathogens and their associated diseases are the following:

Phlebotomine sandflies (Psychodidae):
 Leishmania amazonensis, L. colombiensis, and L. infantum cause visceral leishmaniasis (see also canine leishmaniasis).
 L. braziliensis causes mucocutaneous leishmaniasis.
 L. tropica causes cutaneous leishmaniasis.
 L. peruviana and L. major cause localized cutaneous leishmaniasis.

Triatomine bugs (Reduviidae):
 Trypanosoma cruzi causes trypanosomiasis (Chagas disease).

Ticks (Ixodidae):
 Babesia canis subspecies (Babesia canis canis, B. canis vogeli, B. canis rossi, and B. canis gibsoni) cause babesiosis.
 Ehrlichia canis and E. chaffeensis cause monocytic ehrlichiosis.
 Anaplasma phagocytophilum causes granulocytic anaplasmosis.
 Borrelia burgdorferi causes Lyme disease.
 Rickettsia rickettsii causes Rocky Mountain spotted fever.
 Rickettsia conorii causes Mediterranean spotted fever.

Mosquitoes (Culicidae):
 Dirofilaria immitis and D. repens cause dirofilariasis.

Other parasites:
 Toxocara canis
 Echinococcus

References

Vector-borne disease